Acyl azides are carboxylic acid derivatives with the general formula RCON3.  These compounds, which are a subclass of organic azides, are generally colorless.

Preparation
Typically acyl azides are generated under conditions where they rearrange to the isocyanate.

Alkyl or aryl acyl chlorides react with sodium azide to give acyl azides.

The second major route to azides is from the acyl hydrazides with nitrous acid.

Acyl azides have also been synthesized from various carboxylic acids and sodium azide in presence of triphenylphosphine and trichloroacetonitrile catalysts in excellent yields at mild conditions. Another route starts with aliphatic and aromatic aldehydes reacting with iodine azide which is formed from sodium azide and iodine monochloride in acetonitrile.

Uses
On Curtius rearrangement, acyl azides yield isocyanates.

Acyl azides are also formed in Darapsky degradation,

Historical references

References

Functional groups